Claude Fuller may refer to:

 Claude A. Fuller (1876–1968), lawyer, farmer and U.S. Representative from Arkansas
 Claude Fuller (entomologist) (1872–1928), entomologist in Australia and Southern Africa